The United Party of Independent Alliance (UPIA) is a political party in Kenya.

History 
The party contested the 2022 Kenyan general election as part Azimio La Umoja. Two members were elected to the National Assembly. After the general election, the two UPIA elected members switched to the rival Kenya Kwanza alliance.

Elected representatives

References

See also 

 List of political parties in Kenya

Political parties in Kenya